Turkey participated in the Eurovision Song Contest 2003 with the song "Everyway That I Can" written by Demir Demirkan. The song was performed by Sertab Erener. The entry was selected through an internal selection organised by Turkish broadcaster Türkiye Radyo ve Televizyon Kurumu (TRT).

Background
Prior to the 2003 contest, Turkey had participated in the Eurovision Song Contest 24 times since its first entry in 1975. Turkey missed the 1977 contest because Arab countries pressured the Turkish government to withdraw from the contest because of the dispute over the Status of Jerusalem and 1994 contest due to a poor average score from the preceding contests, which ultimately led to relegation. To this point, the country's best placing was third, which it achieved in 1997 with the song "Dinle" performed by Sebnem Paker and Grup Etnik. Turkey's least successful result was in 1987 when it placed 22nd (last) with the song "Şarkım Sevgi Üstüne" by Seyyal Taner and Lokomotif, receiving 0 points in total.

The Turkish national broadcaster, Turkish Radio and Television Corporation (TRT) broadcasts the event within Turkey and organises the selection process for the nation's entry. Turkey has used various methods to select its entry in the past, such as internal selections and televised national finals to choose the performer and song to compete at Eurovision. Since country's debut at the contest in 1975, the broadcaster has opted to select the country's representative through the national final. However, in order to select country's representative at the 2003 contest, broadcaster decided to internally select both the artist and song for the first time in country's competitive history.

Before Eurovision

Internal selection 
TRT announced Sertab Erener as the Turkish entrant at the Eurovision Song Contest 2003. Her song "Everyway That I Can" was released on 8 March 2003.

At Eurovision 
On the night of the final, Sertab performed 4th in the running order, following Ireland and preceding Malta. Anja von Geldern, Christina Van Leyen, Claudia Kraxner and Özge Fışkın accompanied her in the dance. At the close of voting "Everyway That I Can" had received 167 points (including a maximum 12 from Austria, Belgium, Bosnia and Herzegovina and Netherlands) placing country 1st and winning the contest for Turkey its best result to date. This guaranteed Turkey automatic qualification to the final of the 2004 Contest.

Voting

Congratulations: 50 Years of the Eurovision Song Contest

"Everyway That I Can" was one of fourteen Eurovision songs selected by fans to participate in the Congratulations 50th anniversary show in 2005. It was the only Turkish entry to appear in the main competition. The song was drawn to perform tenth, following "Poupée de cire, poupée de son" by France Gall and preceding "Ne partez pas sans moi" by Celine Dion.

At the end of the first round, "Everyway That I Can" was not among the five songs proceeding to the final round. It was later revealed that "Everyway That I Can" finished ninth with 104 points. It received a sole 12 points from Turkey themselves, who (unlike in standard Eurovision editions) were allowed to vote for their own entry.

Voting

References

2003
Countries in the Eurovision Song Contest 2003
Eurovision